Catherine Michelle Granato (born March 25, 1971) is an American former ice hockey player and one of the first women to be inducted into the Hockey Hall of Fame in November 2010. She currently works as an assistant general manager for the Vancouver Canucks organization. Granato was the captain of the U.S. women's hockey team that won a gold medal in the 1998 Winter Olympics. She is the younger sister of former NHL player Tony Granato and Buffalo Sabres head coach Don Granato, and a graduate of Providence College. Granato played hockey for Concordia University in Montreal, Quebec, Canada.

Granato has been a recipient of the Lester Patrick Award (2007), and she has been inducted into the International Hockey Hall of Fame (2008), the US Hockey Hall of Fame (2009), the Hockey Hall of Fame (2010) and the Rhode Island Hockey Hall of Fame in 2018.

USA Hockey
Granato played in every world championship for the United States from the inaugural event in 1990 to 2005. She was named USA Women's Player of the Year in 1996. Granato was the captain of the U.S. women's hockey team that won a gold medal in the 1998 Winter Olympics. On February 8, 1998, she scored the first ever Olympic goal for the U.S women's hockey team. In 205 career games for the national team, Granato had 186 goals, 157 assists, and 343 points. She is the team's all-time leading scorer.

Granato was cut from the US National team unexpectedly before the 2006 Olympics in Turin, Italy bringing controversy to the decision after being a part of the program since its inaugural season and all-time leading point scorer. The US team subsequently lost its Olympic semifinal match to Sweden, its first-ever international loss to a team other than Canada, and brought home the bronze medal.

Other teams
Granato played hockey for Concordia University in Montreal, Quebec, Canada. In June 1997, New York Islanders general manager Mike Milbury extended an invitation to Granato to attend Islanders training camp. Granato eventually declined.

Granato played for the Vancouver Griffins (2001–02 and 2002–03), a professional women's ice hockey team in the National Women's Hockey League (NWHL).

Later career
Granato is also a rinkside reporter for NBC's NHL coverage, and served as a color commentator for NBC's coverage of women's ice hockey at the 2010 Winter Olympic Games in Vancouver, B.C., Canada. In 1998, Granato served as the color commentator for Los Angeles Kings radio broadcasts.

She currently hosts the On the Bus With Cammi & AJ podcast with former teammate A. J. Mleczko.

Awards and honors
1995 Concordia University Female Athlete of the Year (Sally Kemp Award)
 1996 USA Hockey Women 's Player of the Year Award (also known as the Bob Allen Women's Player of the Year award)
 1998 Winter Olympics – gold medal
 2002 Winter Olympics – silver medal
 On September 18, 2007, Granato was announced one of the four recipients of the 2007 Lester Patrick Trophy. She is a partner in BelaHockey, a company that creates hockey accessories for girls.
 In May 2008, Granato was inducted into the International Ice Hockey Hall of Fame with two other women's hockey players (Geraldine Heaney and Angela James) - the first women to be given such an honor.
 On August 12, 2008, it was announced that Granato would be inducted into the United States Hockey Hall of Fame, the first woman to be in the Hall. The induction ceremony took place on October 10, 2008, at the University of Denver.
 On November 8, 2010 Granato was inducted into the Hockey Hall of Fame. Granato and Angela James were the first female inductees.
 On September 20, 2018, Granato was inducted into the Rhode Island Hockey Hall of Fame.

Personal life
Granato married former NHL star, Ray Ferraro, in 2004 and lives in Vancouver, British Columbia. They have two sons: Riley (born December 2006) and Reese (born December 2009). She is stepmother to Ferraro's sons from his first marriage, Matt and Landon, an NHL draft pick of the Detroit Red Wings. She has four brothers and one sister.

Career statistics
Career statistics are from Eliteprospects.com, or The Internet Hockey Database, or USA Hockey.

Regular season and playoffs

References

External links
 
 Granato's U.S. Olympic Team bio

1971 births
Living people
American people of Italian descent
American television reporters and correspondents
American women's ice hockey centers
American women's ice hockey right wingers
American women television journalists
Concordia University alumni
Hockey Hall of Fame inductees
Ice hockey people from Illinois
Ice hockey players from Illinois
Ice hockey players at the 1998 Winter Olympics
Ice hockey players at the 2002 Winter Olympics
IIHF Hall of Fame inductees
Lester Patrick Trophy recipients
Los Angeles Kings announcers
Medalists at the 1998 Winter Olympics
Medalists at the 2002 Winter Olympics
National Hockey League broadcasters
Olympic gold medalists for the United States in ice hockey
Olympic silver medalists for the United States in ice hockey
People from Downers Grove, Illinois
Providence Friars women's ice hockey players
Concordia Stingers women's ice hockey players